Loretta Chen (born 2 December 1976), is a Singaporean theatre director, television presenter, radio personality and author. She was the Group Business Development & Creative Director of The Activation Group, a regional creative agency and production house. She is currently based in Honolulu but is Visiting Professor at the School of Leadership and Organisational Studies at the University of Southern Maine. She is also Adjunct Professor in Stanford University, Ritsumeikan Asia Pacific University and University of Hawaii.

Education
Chen studied at Anglo-Chinese Junior College and graduated from the National University of Singapore (NUS) with a degree in English Literature and Theatre Studies. She completed her master's degree at Royal Holloway, University of London. She began doctoral studies at the University of California, Los Angeles but transferred to NUS, graduating with a PhD in Theatre (Critical Theory).

Career
Chen was the Treasurer of the Association of Singapore Actors (ASA). In 2008, she was selected by the Mayor of the Northwest CDC to sit on the Arts and Culture Committee. In 2009, she was shortlisted as one of the Nominated Member of Parliament (NMP) candidates for the Arts in Singapore, though an outspoken gay and human rights activist.

Writing career 
Chen published her first book in 2014 with an autobiography, Woman on Top, about her family life and business career.

In 2016, Chen wrote The Elim Chew Story: Driven by Purpose, Destined for Change, a biography about Elim Chew, a female entrepreneur who started the streetwear retail chain 77th Street.

In 2017, Chen published a book, Madonnas and Mavericks: Power Women in Singapore, about 17 Singaporean women who have reached the peaks in various fields such as business, politics, advocacy, sports, lifestyle and the arts. The book includes Jennie Chua, Olivia Lum, Ivy Singh-Lim, Halimah Yacob and Sylvia Lim.

Chen planned to launch her fourth book, Mana Wahine: Power Women in Hawaii, in 2018 and also another book for 2019.

Personal life 
Chen has two older brothers, the elder of whom is former actor Edmund Chen, the other brother, Eric Chen, manages The Activation Group alongside her.

Chen lived in Hawaii with her husband.

Bibliography

References

External links 
Personal Website
Archived Website
 

Singaporean stage actresses
Singaporean people of Hokkien descent
Singaporean theatre directors
Anglo-Chinese Junior College alumni
Singaporean LGBT writers
Living people
21st-century Singaporean actresses
National University of Singapore alumni
1976 births